Meritor, Inc. is an American corporation headquartered in Troy, Michigan, which manufactures automobile components for military suppliers, trucks, and trailers. Meritor is a Fortune 500 company.

In 1997, Rockwell International spun off its automotive business as Meritor. In 2000, ArvinMeritor was formed from the merger of Meritor Automotive, Inc., and Arvin Industries, Inc.

On February 1, 2011, the company announced that it would revert its name to Meritor, Inc. in late March. The name change was successfully completed and launched on March 30, 2011.

On February 22, 2022, Cummins announced to acquire Meritor for $3.7 billion. This is finished on August 3.

Executive management

Charles "Chip" McClure, former president and COO of Federal Mogul Corp., served as the CEO of Meritor from 2004 to 2013. Under his management, Meritor completed the divestiture of the passenger vehicle business segment in January 2011. This officially categorized this global manufacturer/supplier outside of the automotive industry. With its focus on commercial vehicle system component production, Meritor announced continuous sales loss with total revenue at $63 million in 2011 and $52 million in 2012.
In August 2013, Ivor J.”Ike” Evans was named as the interim CEO of Meritor. He had been a member of Board of Directors of Meritor Inc. since 2005 and had previously served as the president and chief operating officer of Union Pacific Railroad from 1998 to 2004, and as the vice chairman of Union Pacific Cooperation from January 2004 to 2005. In July 2015, Jeffrey "Jay" Craig was named CEO of Meritor; he was succeeded by Chris Villavarayan in 2020.

Core business
The business of Meritor consists of axles, brake and safety systems, drivelines, suspensions, trailers, and aftermarket products for defense industries and commercial vehicles including truck, trailer, bus/coach, and off-highway. Meritor engineers a diverse range of products for OEMs, including Daimler, Navistar, and Volvo.

Business distribution

North America
Employing more than 4700 employees, the business facilities in North America contain various distribution locations in Canada, multiple production plants in Mexico, and facilities of administration, production, distribution, sales, and technical centers in the United States.

South America
The Meritor business in South America, which was established in Brazil, employed more than 1700 employees as of 2013. There are four manufacturing facilities, one distribution center, two engineering centers, three administrative offices, and one sales office.

Europe
Also as of 2013, Meritor has administrative offices distributed in France, Netherlands, Russia, Switzerland, Turkey, and United Kingdom, and production facilities in Italy, Sweden, Belgium, United Kingdom, as well as France, and one sales location in Spain.

Asia Pacific
Meritor builds products in Australia and Singapore, as has development joint ventures, distribution centers, and sales locations in China and India. In 2013, the company employed nearly 1800 employees in Asia Pacific region and had been present in the region for close to 30 years.

References

External links

Companies formerly listed on the New York Stock Exchange
Automotive transmission makers
Auto parts suppliers of the United States
Manufacturing companies based in Michigan
Companies based in Troy, Michigan
Automotive companies established in 1997
1997 establishments in Michigan
Corporate spin-offs
2022 mergers and acquisitions